Acacia forsythii, commonly known as Warrumbungle Range wattle, is a shrub belonging to the genus Acacia and the subgenus Phyllodineae that is native to parts of eastern Australia.

The linear, straight or slightly curved phyllodes have a narrowly oblanceolate shape. It blooms between October and March producing yellow flowers.

It is found along the east coast of northern New South Wales at higher altitudes in the Warrumbungle Range as a part of dry sclerophyll forest communities.

See also
 List of Acacia species

References

floydii
Flora of New South Wales
Plants described in 1927
Taxa named by William Blakely
Taxa named by Joseph Maiden